Ella Keighery Hooper (born 30 January 1983) is an Australian rock music singer-songwriter, radio presenter and TV personality. Hooper is the lead singer of Killing Heidi. The band formed in 1996 (when Ella was 13) and also featured her older brother Jesse Hooper. Killing Heidi broke up in 2006. Ella and Jesse have performed small scale venues as an acoustic band, The Verses. 

Hooper has worked on 2DayFM and was one of the two captains in the short-lived revival of the ABC television show Spicks and Specks that commenced in February 2014.

Career

1983–1995: Early years
Born in Melbourne to Helen Keighery and Jeremy Hooper. Hooper grew up in Violet Town, a small rural township (950 people) 175 km north of Melbourne. After finishing Violet Town Primary School, Hooper travelled 27 km by bus to Benalla High School (called Benalla College from 1994) until Year 11. Her parents worked as English and drama teachers, and encouraged Hooper to develop her songwriting skills while Jesse became a guitarist very early on.

1996–2006: Killing Heidi

The Hooper siblings wrote and performed songs for a 1996 Triple J competition and won with "Kettle". Hooper moved to Melbourne after Killing Heidi were signed to a recording deal with Wah Wah Music. 

In August 1999, Killing Heidi released "Weir" as their debut  single. At the ARIA Music Awards of 2000, Killing Heidi won four ARIA Music Awards. 

At the APRA Music Awards of 2001 Ella and Jesse Hooper won Songwriter of the Year.

Killing Heidi released three studio album before disbanding in 2006.

2007–2011: The Verses

In mid-2006, she toured Australia with the all-female musical line-up of Broad, alongside Australian pop musician Deborah Conway, among others.

After Killing Heidi broke up, Hooper began playing acoustic gigs at smaller venues in Australia alongside Jesse as the Verses. 

Verses released one studio album titled Seasons in 2010.

2011–present: Solo career
In March 2011, Hooper released her version of "On the Inside", the theme song to Prisoner.

In 2012, Hooper became the host, mentor and MC for The Telstra Road to Discovery, a respected talent development program that scours the country for the next generation of singing and songwriting talent.

In 2012, Hooper decided to embark on a solo career after a conversation with Stevie Nicks. Hooper  released her first solo single "Low High" on 9 November 2012. The single was produced and recorded by Jan Skubizewski (Owl Eyes, Illy, Way of the Eagle) in his Collingwood studio. 

"Häxan", her second single, was released on 26 April 2013, and launched at The Workers Club on 9 May 2013. A third single, "The Red Shoes", followed in June 2014. All three singles feature on Ella's debut album In Tongues, which was released on 21 November 2014 via Pledge Music.

Hooper returned to television on 5 February 2014, as one of two team captains (along with Adam Richard) in the comeback of the ABC's musical quiz show Spicks and Specks.

In Hooper Ella made a surprise appearance in the seventh episode of an Australian documentary web series called How To Be A Fan With Hex.

In July 2018, Hooper released the single, "To the Bone". She later announced in an interview that she is planning to release a mini-album in 2019.

On 18 January 2019, Hooper was named as an entry in Eurovision - Australia Decides, a competition to represent Australia at the Eurovision Song Contest 2019. Her song "Data Dust" finished 10th out of 10. In February 2019 Hooper confirmed the upcoming release of an EP saying "I've been working on a new EP or mini album over the last few months and playing the new tracks live before they're released is a great way to see what's really connecting with my audience before I put the final touches on the songs."

In 2019, Hooper joined seven celebrities including Lisa Curry, Georgie Parker, Casey Donovan and Lynne McGranger for All new monty|The All New Monty: Ladies Night – a one night only special event choreographed by Todd McKenney, where they bared all for women's health awareness, in particular breast cancer. Hooper shared publicly for the first time that her mum was diagnosed with stage 3 breast cancer.

In 2021 Hooper was revealed to be Baby during Season 3 of The Masked Singer Australia.

In October 2022, Hooper released "Words Like These" and announced her second studio album, Small Town Temple, which was released on 20 January 2023.

Discography

Albums

Extended plays

Singles

References

1983 births
Living people
APRA Award winners
Australian songwriters
Women rock singers
People from Victoria (Australia)
21st-century Australian women singers
21st-century Australian singers